Acanthoscurria insubtilis also known as the Bolivian black velvet tarantula, is a spider which was first described by Eugène Simon in 1892. It is found in Bolivia some reports also stating in Brazil, though it is mainly in the Bolivian Rainforests.

Description 
Males have a dark brown or black coloration, with pinkish hairs on the opisthosoma, carapace and legs. Females own this same coloration, though the carapace and opisthosoma are lighter. It resembles Acanthoscurria theraphosoides as the sexual organs are quite similar in structure, though it can be easily separated from it, as it owns a dark patch on the opisthosoma.

Habitat 
They are mainly found n the Bolivian Rainforests, so I will be basing this section on the Carrasco National Park in Bolivia. The average temperatures of this area are 24ºC, with an average rainfall of 2,500mm. It can range from 280m to 4717m above sea level and is home to 638 species of vertebrates.

Behavior 
It is terrestrial in nature, and a very docile tarantula, with mild venom. They are surprisingly non-skittish, and will not commonly throw urticating hairs. They are primarily nocturnal, and will dig tubular burrows, reaching from 10cm to 20cm in dept.

References 

Spiders of South America
Theraphosidae
Spiders described in 1892